The Hyundai Vision G Concept is a coupe concept car produced by the Hyundai Motor Company. It made its debut on 2015 Pebble Beach Concours d'Elegance after a showcase in The Los Angeles County Museum of Art on August 12. Designed by Hyundai's multiple global design studios and overseen by Peter Schreyer, The Vision G prominently features Hyundai's signature hexagonal grille and restrained take on fluidic sculpture design language. Powered by a 5.0 V8 Hyundai Tau engine producing  at 6,000 rpm, it features multiple new improvements such as improved air intake and new upgraded injection mapping.

While the Vision G bears emblem of Hyundai Genesis, Peter Schreyer, the president of HMC, announced that the car "has nothing to do with the Genesis coupe".

References

Vision G